The mulato pepper  is one of the two dried varieties of the poblano pepper.  Mulatos are dried fully mature poblanos, whereas poblanos that are harvested early and dried are called ancho peppers. 

The mulato is flat and wrinkled, and is always brownish-black in color. The average length and width of the mulato is 10 cm and 5 cm, respectively. Its shape is wide at the top, tapering to a blunt point.

The mulato has been described as tasting somewhat like chocolate or licorice, with undertones of cherry and tobacco. Its heat rating is 2,500 to 3,000 on the Scoville scale.

Chili peppers
Mexican cuisine
Capsicum cultivars